Breakfast Television (often abbreviated as BT) is a Canadian morning television program that is broadcast on Rogers Media's television network Citytv. As of 2023, BT only broadcast from Toronto as a four-hour morning show, while a national edition aired in 8:30-10 a.m. local time on all Citytv stations (outside of Citytv Saskatchewan). Versions were formerly broadcast in Vancouver, Calgary, Winnipeg, Edmonton and Montreal, but have been canceled and replaced with alternative programming. The version broadcast by the Atlantic Satellite Network (which was owned by Citytv's former parent CHUM Limited, and is now owned by competitor Bell Media) continued to use the brand under license from Rogers until 2011, when it was re-launched as CTV Morning Live upon the service's rebranding as CTV 2 Atlantic.

On September 5, 2011, each of the local editions of Breakfast Television across all of the Citytv owned-and-operated stations began starting a half-hour earlier, running from 5:30–9 a.m.  In April 2012, the Winnipeg edition reverted to the 6-9 a.m. runtime.

In September 2019, the Montreal version of the program was discontinued, while the Calgary and Vancouver versions were re-launched on September 23, 2019 using a "hybrid" format incorporating segments of national interest from the Toronto version.

On March 23, 2020, in response to the COVID-19 pandemic in Canada, Breakfast Television added a national hour, airing on all Citytv stations (outside of Citytv Saskatchewan) live at 9:00 a.m. EDT.

On November 17, 2020, BT Vancouver and BT Calgary were cancelled. A national edition now aired in 8:30-10 a.m. local time on all Citytv stations (outside of Citytv Saskatchewan) as a replacement.

History

Breakfast Television premiered on September 9, 1989 with co-hosts Ann Rohmer and David Onley, with MuchMusic VJ Steve Anthony broadcasting from a different spot around the area each day. Kevin Frankish handled news updates from the CityPulse (later CityNews) newsroom (he also handled the overnight updates broadcast from the assignment desk that flowed directly into BT). From 1995 to 2008, BT was simulcast on then-sister station CKVR in Barrie, with VRLand News inserts replacing the CityPulse/CityNews segments.

Co-host Liza Fromer quit her job at BT in July 2006, days after the birth of her child. Kevin Frankish has blogged that her departure from the show was "on the absolute best of terms". BT has encouraged people to send audition tapes for consideration.  During the summer of 2006, a number of CHUM personalities were invited to guest co-host with Kevin Frankish in the search for the next permanent host. The guest hosts included CityNews sports anchor Kathryn Humphreys, health specialist Laura DiBattista, consumer specialist Jee-Yun-Lee, former Citytv weather specialist Nalini Sharma, former reporter Melissa Grelo, etalk correspondent Tracy Melchor, BT's own Jennifer Valentyne, and Star!'s Dina Pugliese. On October 13, 2006, Dina Pugliese became the show's new co-host.

Every August since 2005, BT has organized a "Viewer Appreciation Day", held in the BT parking lot. Gates open at 6 a.m., and closed due to capacity crowds early into 7 a.m. Some people began camping out at BT at 5:30 p.m. the day before the 2006 Viewer Appreciation Day.  Breakfast Television has also held other events, such as a successful world record attempt and a Christmas party. The BT Viewer Appreciation Day has since been canceled, with only the Christmas Party remaining.

Just as many people within the CityNews team started off on the CHUM phoneline, both Jennifer Valentyne and producer Kevin Forget started by working at "the BT Diner".

In March 2019, BT Toronto hosted a week-long kid's competition called BT Kids Got Talent Week, where children showed their talent on the show. It was hosted by BT's Dina Pugliese and Devo Brown.

In April 2020, during an interview on Breakfast Television, Simon Cowell announced a spin-off version of the show called Canadian Family's Got Talent carried out virtually by Citytv during the COVID-19 pandemic in Canada. The contest, presented by Canadian Tire, ran from April 27 to May 26 and was judged by Cowell alongside hosts Dina Pugliese and Devo Brown. The contest was won by Toronto-based singing trio CZN.

In July 2020, Roger Petersen announced that he would be leaving BT.

On January 21, 2021, it was announced Sid Seixeiro of Sportsnet's Tim & Sid would become the new co-host of the program on March 10, 2021.

On February 15, 2023, Dina Pugliese announced her departure from BT, and her last show was on February 24, 2023.

On-air staff

Current 
Anchors/hosts
 Sid Seixeiro - Main host
 Frank Ferragine - Weather Specialist; also a fill-in host
 Tammie Sutherland - News Reporter
 Stephanie Henry - Traffic Reporter
 Devo Brown - Sports and Entertainment Specialist

Former 
 Dina Pugliese - Co-Host
Jennifer Valentyne - Live Eye reporter from 1992 to April. 1, 2016 (now host of The Bachelor & Bachelorette Canada After Show on W Network and a co-host on Derringer in the Morning on Q107)
Steve Anthony - Live Eye reporter 1989 to 1994 (co-host of CP24 Breakfast until 2018 and now head of media relations at Direct Global and Direct Coops)
Hugh Burrill - Sports/early morning talk (later as sports reporter for CityNews and now with FAN 590)
Liza Fromer - Co-host from 2001 to 2006 (left following end of maternity leave and later host of The Morning Show on Global Toronto until late summer 2016; now MC and author)
Russ Holden - Traffic reporter for CHFI since 1967, late with 680News, Citynews and BT (retired September 2017)
Tracy Moore - Reporter/fill-in news anchor from 2005 to 2007 (host of CityLine since 2008)
David Onley - News anchor from 1989 to 1994 (later became Lieutenant Governor of Ontario after he retired from broadcasting and died in 2023.)
Ann Rohmer - Host from 1989 to 2001 (moved on to CP24 after sale to Bell, briefly retired 2015, former anchor with CP24 and now at 105.9)
Kevin Frankish - Co-host from 1989 to 2018; now radio co-host on 105.9 The Region
Roger Petersen - Co-host from 2018 to 2020. Former lead anchor on CityNews and briefly a reporter with CFTO
Nicole Servinis - Live Eye reporter from 2019 to 2021 (now host of Things to Know T.O. on CP24 and CTV) 
Melanie Ng - Former TV News Anchor

Spin-offs

Vancouver edition 
CKVU launched Breakfast Television in 2002. The original hosts of Breakfast Television were Michael Eckford and Fiona Forbes, then they were replaced by Shane Foxman and Beverley Mahood, and since 2005, Simi Sara and Dave Gerry hosted the program, but as of August 13, 2008, they were let go.

On January 19, 2010, the length of BT was shortened from four hours to three hours, and six employees laid off as a result of "severe financial issues" with the Citytv stations.

A new format for Breakfast Television debuted in September 2008, with a new traffic and TransLink reporter. As part of Rogers Media's May 3, 2012 renewal of its affiliation agreement with Jim Pattison Group-owned Citytv affiliates CKPG-TV/Prince George, CFJC-TV/Kamloops and CHAT-TV/Medicine Hat, the three stations will begin simulcasting the Vancouver edition of Breakfast Television on September 1, 2012 as part of an expansion of Citytv programming on the stations, which will follow the program grid of CKVU (with breakaways from the Vancouver program grid for their weekday evening and midday newscasts and other locally produced programs).

On September 5, 2019, Rogers laid off 4 employees from CKVU and placed Breakfast Television on hiatus until September 23. At this time the program was relaunched with a new hybrid format, consisting of a mixture of local content with national entertainment and lifestyle segments produced from Toronto.

On November 17, 2020, Rogers Sports & Media imposed staff cuts across the country, including cancelling Breakfast Television in Vancouver and Calgary.

Former presenters
 Tasha Chiu (2008–2008)
 Michael Eckford - Host (2002–2003), was at CKNW 980
 Fiona Forbes - Host (2002–2003), was at Shaw TV Vancouver
 Beverley Mahood - Host (2003–2005); was co-host of CMT Canada's flagship program, CMT Central)
 Simi Sara (2005–2008), now at Global News Radio 980 CKNW
 Jody Vance (2012–2016) - Co-host/news anchor, was at Roundhouse Radio
 Dawn Chubai (2004-2017) - Host (Trending, Live Eye, Weather)
 Riaz Meghji - Host (2008-2019)
 Kyle Donaldson - News anchor (2017-2020)
 Mary Cranston -  News anchor (2019-2020)
 Greg Harper - Reporter/news anchor (2010-2020)
 Thor Diakow - Entertainment host/traffic (2005-2020)
 Russ Lacate - Weather (2011-2020)

Calgary edition 
CHUM Limited purchased Craig Media in late 2004. The $265 million deal included, among other things, Craig's three A-Channel stations (CKAL-TV in Calgary, Alberta; CKEM-TV in Edmonton, Alberta and CHMI-TV in Winnipeg, Manitoba).

In February 2005, CHUM announced that the A-Channel stations would be relaunched as Citytv stations by that fall. The morning show on the original A-Channel stations, The Big Breakfast, was relaunched as Breakfast Television on August 2, 2005 alongside their re-branding as Citytv. The A-Channel brand was subsequently transferred to CHUM's NewNet stations, whose own morning programs were retitled A-Channel Morning.

As in Vancouver, Rogers made cuts to Breakfast Television in Calgary in September 2019, placing the program on hiatus and re-launching it on September 23 with the same, aforementioned format changes.

Former presenters
 Ross Hull - Live Eye reporter
 Dave Kelly - Main anchor (2005–2009)
 Mike McCourt - News anchor
 Jill Belland - Host

Winnipeg edition 
CHMI-TV in Winnipeg, Manitoba produced a version of Breakfast Television from August 2, 2005 to January 6, 2015 - the station was purchased along with CKAL-DT in Calgary and CKEM-DT in Edmonton. The final hosts were Courtney Ketchen, Jeremy John, Jenna Khan and Drew Kozub. It was replaced with a simulcast of Wheeler in the Morning—the morning show of sister radio station CITI-FM—starting on January 12, 2015. Khan and Kozub were retained as co-hosts for news and entertainment segments shown during the program on television in place of music.

Former presenters
 Pay Chen - Host (2009-2011)
 Jon Ljungberg - Host (?-2010)
 Erin Selby - Host (2005-2007)

Atlantic Canada edition
From 1992 to 2011, the Atlantic Satellite Network (ASN) in Atlantic Canada, now known as CTV Two Atlantic, aired its own local version of BT. At the time of its launch, ASN and Citytv (Toronto) were both owned by CHUM Limited, and both channels had a similar overall movies-focused format. The Atlantic edition of BT was similar to the Toronto version, but with a greater emphasis on the culture of the region, as matters such as commuter traffic are typically less of a concern in Atlantic Canada.

ASN was acquired by Baton Broadcasting (predecessor of the present-day Bell Media) in 1997, but was permitted to continue using Breakfast Television as the title of its morning show. In August 2011, the program was re-branded as CTV Morning Live, in keeping with the launch (or relaunch) of local morning shows under the same title on CTV and CTV Two stations in various parts of Canada.

Edmonton edition 
On May 7, 2015, Rogers announced the cancellation of Breakfast Television in Edmonton as part of cutbacks. It was replaced by a spin-off known as Dinner Television, which was a two-hour weeknight newsmagazine which did not contain original news reporting. Encores of the previous edition of Dinner Television with an "L-bar" displaying updated news and weather information were broadcast during its former morning timeslot. Dinner Television was subsequently cancelled and replaced by the newly relaunched CityNews in 2017. The morning timeslot is now filled by CityLine.

Former presenters
 Bill Welychka - Host (2005-2006)

Montreal edition 
Rogers was granted approval by the CRTC on December 20, 2012 to acquire CJNT Montreal and convert it from a multicultural station to a fully English Citytv station. As part of the approval, Rogers had until September 1, 2013 to produce local programming on the station, which included a three-hour Montreal edition of Breakfast Television.

On June 6, 2013, Rogers announced that the Montreal edition of Breakfast Television would premiere on August 26, 2013, and would be hosted by Alexandre Despatie and Joanne Vrakas. Despatie left the program in 2015, and was succeeded by Derick Fage.

On September 5, 2019, Rogers Media announced the cancellation of Breakfast Television Montreal, effective immediately. Colette Watson, senior vice-president of television and broadcast operations at Rogers Media, stated: "This was a difficult decision, but at the end of the day, the show was not sustainable".

Former presenters
 Joanne Vrakas - Co-host
 Derick Fage - Co-host (2015-2019)
 Catherine Verdon Diamond - Weather and traffic
 Alexandre Despatie - Co-host (2013-2015)

References

External links

 Breakfast Television

1989 Canadian television series debuts
1980s Canadian television talk shows
1990s Canadian television talk shows
2000s Canadian television talk shows
2010s Canadian television talk shows
2020s Canadian television talk shows
Television morning shows in Canada
Citytv original programming
English-language television shows
Television shows filmed in Calgary
Television shows filmed in Edmonton
Television shows filmed in Montreal
Television shows filmed in Toronto
Television shows filmed in Vancouver
Television shows filmed in Winnipeg
1980s Canadian television news shows
1990s Canadian television news shows
2000s Canadian television news shows
2010s Canadian television news shows
2020s Canadian television news shows